Wazir Agha was a Pakistani Urdu language writer, poet, critic and essayist. He has written many poetry and prose books. He was also editor and publisher of the literary magazine "Auraq" for many decades. He introduced many theories in Urdu literature. His most famous work is on Urdu humour. His books focus on modern Urdu poets, notably those who have written more poems instead of ghazals. Agha's poems have mostly an element of story.

Agha has received Sitara-e-Imtiaz for his best contributions to Urdu literature. He was also nominated for the Nobel Prize.

Personal life

Background

Agha was born on 18 May 1922 in the village Wazir Kot in the Sargodha district.  His father was a businessman who dealt in horses from the Persian-speaking Qizilbash family. Wazir's father obtained  of land from the British government in the Sargodha district.

Agha learned Persian from his father, Punjabi from his mother. During his school years, he developed a strong fondness for Urdu ghazals and started composing poetry on his own. He graduated from Government College, Jhang and later received his master's degree in economics from Government College, Lahore. He gained his PhD from the University of Punjab in 1956 for his research on humor and satire in Urdu Literature.

Wazir Agha died on 8 September 2010 in Lahore. He was buried in his native village, Wazirkot, near Sargodha, Punjab, Pakistan.

Literary career

Agha was the editor of the college magazine Chanab in Government College, Jhang. In 1944, he came across Salahuddin Ahmad who was the editor of the famous monthly magazine, Adabi Duniya. He encouraged Wazir Agha to write. He was asked to contribute by writing essays on topics uncommon in Urdu Literature of that time, such as economics, philosophy, psychology. In 1953, his work on "In search of happiness" was compiled as a book that opened a formal paradigm of research in Urdu literature.

From 1960 to 1963, he acted as a co-editor of Adabi Duniya and from 1965 onwards, he remained editor of monthly Auraq for many decades. He established himself as a critic.

The Pakistan Academy of Letters (PAL) has published a book on Agha's life and work as part of its publishing project, "Makers of Pakistani Literature". He was also Life Fellow of PAL since 1995. He also wrote an autobiography Shaam Ki Mundair Sey.

Awards
 Sitara-e-Imtiaz (Star of Excellence) Award by the President of Pakistan

Bibliography

Books
Adab Mein Tanz-o-Mazah (1958)
Takhleequi Amal (1970)
Urdu Shairi Ka Mizaaj (1965)
Tasawuraat-e- Ishq-o- Khird – Iqbal Ki Nazar Mein (1977)
Majeed Amjad Ki Dastaan-e-Muhabbat (1991)
Ghalib Ka Zauq-e-Tamasha (1997)

Essays
Khayal Paray (Inshaiye or light essays)
Nazam-e-Jadeed Ki Karwatein (1963)
Tanqeed Aur Ehtesaab (1968)
Naye Maqaalaat (1972)
Naye Tanaazur (1979)
Maani Aur Tanaazur (1998)
Tanqeed Aur Majlisi Tanqeed (1975)
Tanqeed Aur Jadeed Urdu Tanqeed (1989)
Daairey Aur Lakirein (1986)
Inshaiye Kei Khad-o-Khaal (1990)
Saakhtiat Aur Science (1991)
Dastak Us Darwaazey Par (1994)
Imtizaji Tanqeed Ka Scienci Aur Fikri Tanaazur (2006)

Poetry
Ghaas Mein Titlian
Aadhi Sadi ke Baad (After 50 years)

See also
List of Pakistani poets
list of Urdu poets
List of Pakistani writers
List of Urdu writers

References

External links
 Official Website
 Dr Wazir Agha remembered

1922 births
2010 deaths
Pakistani scholars
Pakistani writers
Pakistani literary critics
Linguists from Pakistan
People from Sargodha District
Government College University, Lahore alumni
Urdu-language non-fiction writers
Recipients of Sitara-i-Imtiaz
Linguists of Urdu
Sonneteers
Urdu critics